Adriane dos Santos (born 20 July 1988), commonly known as Adriane or Nenê, is a Brazilian football forward who plays for Ferroviária and the Brazil women's national football team. She previously played in the United States for FC Gold Pride of Women's Professional Soccer.

Club career
In November 2013, Adriane left Ferroviária to sign for 2013 Copa Libertadores Femenina winners São José.

In the 2015 Copa Libertadores Femenina, she played for Ferroviária again.

Career statistics

Club career

References

External links
 
 Women's Professional Soccer player profile

1988 births
Living people
Brazilian women's footballers
People from Ji-Paraná
FC Gold Pride players
Brazil women's international footballers
Brazilian expatriate women's footballers
Brazilian expatriate sportspeople in the United States
Expatriate women's soccer players in the United States
Santos FC (women) players
Associação Ferroviária de Esportes (women) players
Women's association football midfielders
Sport Club Corinthians Paulista (women) players
Botucatu Futebol Clube players
Women's Professional Soccer players
Sportspeople from Rondônia